Lightning Hopkins Sings the Blues, also released as Original Folk Blues, is a 12-inch LP album by blues musician Lightnin' Hopkins collecting tracks recorded between 1947 and 1951 that were originally released as 10-inch 78rpm records on the RPM label. The album was released on the Mainstream Records low budget, Crown subsidiary and was an early 12-inch LP collections of Lightnin' Hopkins material recorded at Gold Star Studios to be released. In 1999 a double CD collection of Jake Head Boogie was released containing all of the Hopkins recordings released by the RPM label along with several previously unreleased recordings.

Track listing
All compositions by Sam "Lightnin'" Hopkins
 "Just Sittin' Down Thinkin'" – 2:33
 "Jake Head Boogie" – 2:53
 "Lonesome Dog Blues" – 2:38
 "Tell Me Pretty Mama" – 3:03
 "Last Affair" – 2:55
 "Don't Keep My Baby Long" – 2:15
 "Santa Fe Blues" – 2:23
 "Give Me Back That Wig" – 1:56
 "Someday" – 2:38
 "Ain't It Lonesome" – 2:36

Personnel
Lightnin' Hopkins – guitar, vocals

References

Lightnin' Hopkins albums
1961 albums
Crown Records albums